The Agence Nationale de l’Aviation Civile is the civil aviation agency of Burkina Faso. Its head office is in Ouagadougou.

References

External links

 Agence Nationale de l’Aviation Civile 
 Dembele, Françoise. "Burkina Faso: Agence nationale de l'aviation civile - Abel Sawadogo prend les commandes." (Archive) Le Pays. 10 October 2011.
Civil aviation in Burkina Faso
Burkina Faso
Government of Burkina Faso
Transport organisations based in Burkina Faso